Roger Alan Brady (born November 11, 1946) is a former United States Air Force (USAF) four-star general who last served as the 33rd Commander, U.S. Air Forces in Europe (USAFE) which he also concurrently served as commander of NATO Allied Air Command, Ramstein Air Base, Germany and director of Joint Air Power Competence Center, Kalkar, Germany from January 9, 2008, to December 13, 2010. Prior to that he served as deputy chief of staff for manpower and personnel from June 2004 to January 2008. As commander of USAFE, he has responsibility for USAF activities in the U.S. Africa Command theater.

He has commanded a support group and flying training wing, and he was vice commander of an air logistics center. The general has served as a director of personnel, logistics, plans and programs, and operations at three major commands. His involvement in deployed operations includes service in Vietnam, deployment of NATO forces in support of Operation Desert Storm, securing coalition support for the stand-up of expeditionary wings during Operation Allied Force, and providing Total Force and Civil Reserve Air Fleet air mobility support to operations Noble Eagle, Enduring Freedom and Iraqi Freedom.

General Brady is a command pilot with more than 3,900 hours in T-37, T-38, T-1, KC-135, C-21, and C-5.

General Brady's retirement ceremony was held December 13, 2010 at Ramstein AB and he ended active duty as of February 1, 2011. Since retirement, he has served on the board of trustees for Mid-Atlantic Christian University.

Education
General Brady entered the USAF in 1969 through the University of Oklahoma (OU) Air Force ROTC program. While at OU, he earned a Bachelor of Arts degree in foreign services in 1968, followed by a Master of Arts degree in political science from Colorado State University in 1969. Brady received additional professional military education at the Air Command and Staff College at Maxwell Air Force Base, and the National War College at Fort McNair, in addition to administrative and national security programs at Columbia University and Harvard University.

Assignments
 November 1969 – July 1970, student, Armed Forces Air Intelligence Training Center, Lowry Air Force Base, Colorado
 July 1970 – July 1971, air intelligence officer, 20th Tactical Air Support Squadron, Da Nang Air Base, South Vietnam
 July 1971 – June 1972, Chief, Target Processing Branch, 320th Bomb Wing, Mather AFB, California
 July 1972 – October 1973, student, undergraduate pilot training, 71st Flying Training Wing, Vance AFB, Oklahoma
 November 1973 – March 1974, student, KC-135 Aircrew Training, Castle AFB, California
 April 1974 – April 1977, co-pilot, aircraft and flight commander of 301st Air Refueling Wing, Rickenbacker AFB, Ohio
 May 1977 – August 1977, student, pilot instructor training, 12th Flying Training Wing, Randolph AFB, Texas
 September 1977 – August 1981, instructor pilot, flight commander and Chief, Standardization and Evaluation Division, 64th Flying Training Wing, Reese AFB, Texas
 August 1981 – June 1982, student, Air Command and Staff College, Maxwell AFB, Alabama
 July 1982 – June 1984, Chief, T-38 Standardization and Evaluation, Directorate of Operations, Headquarters Air Training Command, Randolph AFB, Texas
 July 1984 – July 1987, staff officer, Airlift Special Operations and Training Division, later, special assistant and executive officer to the deputy chief of staff for research, development and acquisition, Headquarters U.S. Air Force, Washington, D.C.
 August 1987 – June 1988, student, National War College, Fort Lesley J. McNair, Washington, D.C.
 July 1988 – June 1991, staff officer, Policies and Studies Branch, later, Chief, Long-Range Plans Branch, AIRSOUTH Arms Control Team, and later, Chief, Programs and Requirements Branch, Allied Air Forces Southern Europe, Naples, Italy
 July 1991 – May 1992, commander of 3415th Support Group, Lowry AFB, Colorado
 June 1992 – June 1993, director of personnel, Headquarters Air Training Command, Randolph AFB, Texas
 July 1993 – July 1995, commander of 64th Flying Training Wing, Reese AFB, Texas
 August 1995 – June 1997, vice commander of Ogden Air Logistics Center, Hill AFB, Utah
 July 1997 – June 1998, director of logistics, Headquarters U.S. Air Forces in Europe, Ramstein AB, Germany
 July 1998 – July 1999, director of plans and programs, Headquarters USAFE, Ramstein AB, Germany
 July 1999 – October 2000, director of logistics, Headquarters Air Mobility Command, Scott AFB, Illinois
 October 2000 – November 2003, director of operations, Headquarters AMC, Scott AFB, Illinois
 November 2003 – June 2004, special assistant to the chief of staff for force development, Headquarters U.S. Air Force, Washington, D.C.
 June 2004 – January 2008, deputy chief of staff, personnel, Headquarters U.S. Air Force, Washington, D.C.
 January 2008 – December 2010, commander of U.S. Air Forces in Europe; commander of NATO Allied Air Component Command, Ramstein; and director of Joint Air Power Competence Center, Kalkar, Germany

Flight information
Rating: Command pilot
Flight hours: 3,900
Aircraft flown: T-37, T-38, T-1, KC-135, C-21 and C-5

Awards and decorations

Other awards
September 7, 2010: Order of the Sword, USAFE.

Effective dates of promotion

See also
List of commanders of USAFE

References

  Official Biography

1946 births
Living people
United States Air Force personnel of the Vietnam War
United States Air Force personnel of the Gulf War
Colorado State University alumni
Columbia University alumni
Harvard University alumni
Recipients of the Defense Superior Service Medal
Recipients of the Defense Distinguished Service Medal
Recipients of the Air Force Distinguished Service Medal
Recipients of the Legion of Merit
United States Air Force generals
University of Oklahoma alumni
Recipients of the Meritorious Service Medal (United States)